Cameron Hawkes (born 15 March 2000) is an English professional footballer who plays as a midfielder.

Career
After playing for Sheffield United, he signed a one-year professional contract with Bradford City in March 2018. He made his professional debut on 1 May 2018, in a 1–1 home draw in the league against Walsall, appearing as a 67th minute substitute for Callum Guy. On 28 March 2019, Hawkes was loaned out to Boston United for the rest of the season.

In May 2019, following Bradford City's relegation to League Two, it was announced that he would leave the club upon the expiry of his contract on 30 June 2019, one of 11 players to be released.

Career statistics

References

2000 births
Living people
English footballers
Sheffield United F.C. players
Bradford City A.F.C. players
Boston United F.C. players
English Football League players
Association football midfielders